Bruce Sterling (born 1954) is an American science fiction author.

Bruce Sterling may also refer to:

Bruce Foster Sterling (1870–1946), U.S. Representative from Pennsylvania
Bruce Sterling (Love of Life), fictional character in an American soap opera
Bruce Sterling Jenkins (born 1927), American attorney, politician, and jurist
Bruce Sterling Woodcock (born 1970), American computer and video games industry analyst